Harry Sotaro Kawabe (June 10, 1890 – November 1969) was a Japanese businessman who was incarcerated during World War II. He is known for contributing greatly to the economy of Seward, Alaska. In 1969, he founded the Kawabe Memorial House for elderly Japanese Americans, and the 154-unit complex was built through the HUD Senior Housing program in 1972.

Biography
Harry Sotaro Kawabe was born on June 10, 1890 in a small rural village near Osaka, Japan. His family members were farmers. In 1906, Kawabe moved to Seattle, Washington and worked as a houseboy. He moved to Alaska in 1909, hoping to become rich off of gold mining. He did not have much luck and used what he had to move to Seward. He started buying empty lots and businesses in Seward. In 1923 he moved back to Japan and married Toshiko Suzuki (c.1901-1930), who died in 1930. He moved back to Alaska and married Tomo Kawano (August 1, 1893 - March 1970). Harry and Tomo had no children of their own but were kind to the local children, doing things such as driving the children in one of the town's few cars. When the Japanese attacked Pearl Harbor Kawabe, his wife, and other Japanese American residents of Seward were detained at Fort Richardson. At the end of the war the detainees returned to Seward, however, Harry and Tomo moved to Seattle after staying in Alaska for a while. In 1953, after the McCarran-Walter Act removed restrictions that had barred Asian immigrants from naturalization since 1924, Harry was allowed to obtain U.S. citizenship. In 1978, the Kawabe Scholarship, given to Seward High School students, was created in his honor. Harry died in November 1969.

Businesses
While in Seward Kawabe owned various businesses, such as:

 Bank of Seward
 Kawabe's Gift Store
 Alaska Furs
 Seward Hardware Company
 Place Hotel and Bar
 Moose Bar
 local liquor store
 Marathon Cafe
 Seward Grill
 O.K. Barber Shop
 Miller Barber Shop
 Northern Apartments
 Dreamland Hall
 various laundromats

References

1890 births
1969 deaths
Businesspeople from Alaska
Japanese businesspeople
Japanese emigrants to the United States
People from Seward, Alaska
People from Osaka Prefecture
Businesspeople from Seattle
Japanese-American internees
20th-century American businesspeople